Pentaphylax is a genus of flowering plants, with one or two species which are shrubs and small trees.  The species has simple evergreen leaves that are alternately arranged on the stems.  The flower pistil is 5 celled and the anthers dehiscing via pores and basifixed.
Flowers have five petals and five sepals that are distinct from each other and five stamens attached oppositely to the sepals. The seeds are winged.

Native from Tropical areas of South China to Malay Peninsula and Sumatra.

Species include:
Pentaphylax euryoides

Taxonomy
The APG III system of 2009 places the genus in the family Pentaphylacaceae, along with genera formerly placed in the Ternstroemiaceae. Pentaphylax has often been placed in its own family, the Pentaphylacaceae, separated from the Theaceae or Ternstroemiaceae based on the structure of the anthers and, arguably, the ovules. However, some molecular data and curved embryos (typical of the Ternstroemiaceae) point to a close relationship with the Ternstroemiaceae.

The taxonomic placement of this species and the family has varied, due mostly to a shortage of information. Included here are some classifications given by different botanists: 
Short's Subclass Dicotyledonae; Crassinucelli (?).
Dahlgren's Superorder Theiflorae (?); Theales (?).
Cronquist’s Subclass Dilleniidae; Theales. 
Angiosperm Phylogeny Group (1998) family of uncertain position at the highest group level.
subfamily Ternstroemioideae within the Theaceae.

References

External links
Picture

Pentaphylacaceae
Ericales genera